The White Paper on the National Transition of Catalonia is a white paper that analyzes the different aspects to consider in the process of transition towards an independent Catalonia. The book, published by the Government of Catalonia in 2014, includes all of the reports prepared by the Advisory Council for the National Transition and a summary of those made by the Secretary of the Council.

References

External links 
 White Paper on the National Transition of Catalonia

White papers
Catalan independence movement
2014 documents
2014 in Catalonia
September 2014 events in Europe